Guy Dupré (February 27, 1928 – January 17, 2018) was a French writer and publisher.

Biography 
Dupré published three novels, two books of memoirs and a collection of chronicles, but the unity of his style and his writing unconcerned with traditional genres makes the same voice heard from one book to the other.

At the time of its publication (1953), his first work, Les Fiancées sont froides, was hailed by Albert Béguin, André Breton, and Julien Gracq. This poetic and initiatory account, with its rather obscure intrigue, bears the imprint of German Romanticism. Plotting a fugitive hussar in the time of the Napoleonic wars, it is set on the shores of the Baltic Sea and is not without evoking Le Coup de Grâce (1939) by Marguerite Yourcenar. The subject and the style of the book earned Dupré to be attached to the movement of the Hussards.

Guy Dupré joined the publishing house Plon, which has long specialized in military memorabilia. He prepared a biography of General Charles Mangin that was never completed but whose face would appear in Le Grand coucher. He made an anthology of Maurice Barrès (Mes Cahiers, Plon, 1962), an anthology of the Chroniques de la Grande Guerre of the same (Plon, 1968), as well as the cross-correspondence between Maurice Barrès and Charles Maurras: La République ou le Roi, correspondance 1888-1923, Plon, 1970.

Close to novelist , he wrote the preface for his L'Étoile de l'Empire invisible (Guy Trédaniel, 1994).

Bibliography 
1953: Les Fiancées sont froides, Plon
1986: Les Mamantes, Éditions Grasset
1989: Les Manœuvres d'automne, Éditions Olivier Orban,  Prix Novembre
1996: C'est le sang de l'amour et le sang de la peine, Guy Trédaniel
2001: Comme un adieu dans une langue oubliée, Grasset
2002: Dis-moi qui tu hantes, éditions du Rocher 
2010: L'âme charnelle, Journal 1953-1978, Éditions Bartillat

In 2003, Guy Dupré was awarded the Grand Prix de Littérature Henri Gal of the Académie française for Dis-moi qui tu hantes, and his life achievement.

External links 
 Le Grand Coucher de Guy Dupré on Stalker
 Les mystères levés de Guy Dupré on Valeurs Actuelles
 Guy Dupré on the site of the Académie française
 Guy Dupré : Le grand coucher on INA.fr

1928 births
2018 deaths
People from Fécamp
Writers from Normandy
20th-century French non-fiction writers
21st-century French non-fiction writers
Prix Décembre winners